is a Japanese manga artist. He won the Kodansha Manga Award for shōnen for Gakuto Retsuden (ja) in 1982 and the Shogakukan Manga Award twice, for shōnen for Musashi no Ken in 1984 and for general manga in 1996 for Ron, serialized in Big Comic Original from 1991 to 2006. In 1998, he received an Excellence Prize at the Japan Media Arts Festival for Ron. Jin won the Grand Prize at the 2011 Tezuka Osamu Cultural Prize. On a list published in the beginning of August 2011, he ranked as the 35th best-selling manga artist since January 2010, with 1,901,000 copies sold.

Works 
Musashi no Ken
Jin

References

External links 
 Official Website 
 
 Profile at The Ultimate Manga Guide

1951 births
Living people
Manga artists from Tokyo
Winner of Kodansha Manga Award (Shōnen)
People from Setagaya